William Thomas Williams (born Esher, 23 August 1942) is an English former professional football player and football manager.

Williams played for Portsmouth, Queens Park Rangers, West Bromwich Albion, Mansfield Town and Gillingham, making over 250 Football League appearances in total. He also had a spell playing for Maidstone United before becoming player-manager of South African outfit Durban City.

After spending around five years at Durban City, Williams went to manage in America spending a year each at Sacramento Gold and the Atlanta Chiefs. After returning to England in 1981 Williams took over at the original Maidstone United, spending three years at the club before agreeing to move back to South Africa to manage Durban United. In 1986 Williams again took over the reins at Maidstone before becoming general manager of the club from 1987–1991. After the sacking of Graham Carr in 1991, Williams became Maidstone first team manager for the third time but lasted only a matter of months before being replaced by Clive Walker. In 1997 Williams took the manager's job at Dover Athletic and led the club to their highest ever league finish when the club came 6th in the Football Conference in the 1999–2000 season. After leaving Dover in 2001 Williams spent a short time managing Kingstonian.

Williams has since returned to the re-formed Maidstone United and has been a key member of the club for a number of years. He is currently Chief Executive and Director of Football and played a major role in moving the club to the Gallagher Stadium after 24 years of homelessness.

References

1942 births
Living people
People from Esher
English footballers
English football managers
Portsmouth F.C. players
Queens Park Rangers F.C. players
West Bromwich Albion F.C. players
Mansfield Town F.C. players
Gillingham F.C. players
Dover Athletic F.C. managers
Maidstone United F.C. (1897) players
Association football defenders
English expatriate football managers
Expatriate soccer managers in the United States
Expatriate soccer managers in South Africa
English expatriate sportspeople in the United States
English expatriate sportspeople in South Africa
American Soccer League (1933–1983) coaches
Atlanta Chiefs coaches
North American Soccer League (1968–1984) coaches